Super J-Cup: 3rd Stage was the third Super J-Cup professional wrestling tournament, it was hosted by Michinoku Pro Wrestling (MPW). The tournament was a single-elimination tournament of four rounds and was a two-night event featuring junior heavyweights from various Japanese promotions. The first round of the event was held on April 1, 2000 at Sendai City Gymnasium in Sendai, Japan and the final three rounds were held on April 9, 2000 at Sumo Hall in Tokyo, Japan, which had been the site for the previous two tournaments. This event marked the first time that the Super J-Cup was held at an additional venue rather than Sumo Hall.

The 1995 winner Jushin Thunder Liger won the tournament for the second consecutive time by defeating Cima in the final round. In non-tournament matches, Abismo Negro defeated El Oriental, a ten-man tag team match took place and Chaparita Asari retained the WWWA Super Lightweight Championship, marking the first time that a championship was defended at Super J-Cup and women wrestlers competed at Super J-Cup.

Background
Super J-Cup was conceived by New Japan Pro-Wrestling's (NJPW) junior heavyweight booker Jushin Thunder Liger. The idea was to host an interpromotional single elimination tournament, bringing junior heavyweight wrestlers from several promotions from Japan and all over the world to give an opportunity to junior heavyweight wrestlers to showcase their talent on a national level and achieve stardom. Many wrestlers benefited from the inaugural tournament in 1994, which was critically acclaimed and was a commercial success.

A year later, Wrestle Association R (WAR) held the second edition of the tournament in 1995, which sold out Sumo Hall again with the same crowd of 11,500. The event itself was a success and earned critical acclaim but was not equivalent to its predecessor. After a five-year hiatus, Michinoku Pro Wrestling (MPW) decided to host the tournament in 2000 in an attempt to revive the junior heavyweight wrestling and Jushin Thunder Liger cooperated with The Great Sasuke and MPW to participate in the tournament. Most of the participants were from Japan while some participants were also invited from North America to participate in the tournament. The event was called Super J-Cup: 3rd Stage and marked the first time that the tournament was being held at some other venue rather than Sumo Hall as the first round matches were held at Sendai City Gymnasium in Sendai, Japan on April 1 and the next three rounds would be held at Sumo Hall.

Qualifying matches
Big Japan Pro Wrestling (BJW) held a qualification tournament with the winner representing BJW in the 2000 Super J-Cup.
February 23, 2000 (Odawara Arena in Odawara, Kanagawa)

February 29, 2000 (Kumagaya City Gymnasium in Kumagaya, Saitama)

March 2, 2000 (Kawasaki City Gymnasium in Kawasaki, Kanagawa)

Tournament brackets

Participants
The tournament featured sixteen participants with most of the wrestlers primarily from the hosting promotion Michinoku Pro Wrestling. Most of the participants were new additions in the Super J-Cup while returning participants were the winner of the 1995 tournament Jushin Thunder Liger in his third consecutive Super J-Cup as well as 1994 quarter-finalist Ricky Fuji and runner-up The Great Sasuke returning to the tournament for their second Super J-Cup.

April 1

The first round of the tournament was held on April 1, 2000 at Kamei Arena Sendai in Sendai, Japan. Cima defeated the Mexican wrestler Ricky Marvin to kick off the tournament. The quarter-finalist of the 1994 Super J-Cup, Ricky Fuji returned to the tournament, making his second Super J-Cup appearance as he defeated Sasuke the Great by disqualification to advance to his second consecutive Super J-Cup quarter-final. In the following three matches, Naoki Sano defeated Judo Suwa, Men's Teioh defeated Katsumi Usuda and Onryo defeated Curry Man. The junior heavyweight legend Gran Hamada made his first Super J-Cup appearance by gaining a submission victory over Shinya Makabe. The 1994 runner-up The Great Sasuke competed in his second Super J-Cup by defeating Kaz Hayashi. In the final match of the first round, the 1995 winner Jushin Liger made his third consecutive Super J-Cup appearance, in which he defeated Tiger Mask.
Results

April 9

The final matches of the tournament were held on April 9, 2000 at the Sumo Hall in Tokyo, Japan, marking the return of the Super J-Cup to the Sumo Hall. The first match was a non-tournament special attraction match featuring luchadores in which Abismo Negro defeated El Oriental. The match was followed by quarter-final round of the Super J-Cup, which started with Cima beating Onryo and Gran Hamada defeating Ricky Fuji. Naoki Sano scored an upset by defeating The Great Sasuke via knockout. Jushin Liger defeated Men's Teioh in the last quarter-final match to qualify for the semi-final.

Next, was a women's match, in which Chaparita Asari successfully defended the WWWA Super Lightweight Championship against Hiromi Yagi, marking the first time that a joshi match was held at a Super J-Cup event and a championship was defended in the Super J-Cup. The title match was followed by the semi-final round, in which Jushin Liger defeated Gran Hamada and Cima defeated Naoki Sano to qualify for the final.

The semi-final round was followed by a refreshment ten-man tag team match, featuring several junior heavyweight wrestlers, including those who had been eliminated from the tournament in the first round on April 1. The team of Tiger Mask, Minoru Tanaka, 1995 Super J-Cup first round participant Masaaki Mochizuki, Shinya Makabe and Ricky Marvin defeated Kendo Kashin, El Samurai, Judo Suwa, Super Boy and Chabinger. This was followed by the tournament final, in which Jushin Thunder Liger defeated Cima to win the 2000 Super J-Cup, winning his second consecutive Super J-Cup tournament in the process.
Results

Tournament brackets

Reception
The Super J-Cup: 3rd Stage was not as successful as the previous two editions of the event. The second night of the event which was held at the Sumo Hall, the venue of the first two Super J-Cup tournaments, failed to draw a large crowd just like the previous two editions. According to Paul Cooke of Cross Arm Breaker, Michinoku Pro Wrestling had lost much of its momentum and fanbase in puroresu which it had gained during the mid-1990s and was unable to gain the same fanbase which New Japan Pro-Wrestling was able to build around. The failure to obtain famous competitors for this tournament has also been cited as the reason for lack of audience. The actual crowd number of the final round is disputed. According to some sources, a crowd drew of 7,000, while most of the sources state that the event was able to draw a crowd of over 8,000 people.

According to Cooke, the Super J-Cup: 3rd Stage was "a fun, watchable tournament from start to finish with a fascinating cast of wrestlers." While comparing to the 1994 and 1995 editions of the Super J-Cup: 3rd Stage, Cooke stated "From a pure match quality perspective, Super J-Cup Stage 3 does not match up to the original. It also probably is not as far away as many felt at the time. If we are taking non-tournament matches out of the equation, the 2000 version feels comparable to the 1995 one. There are no matches to go out of your way worth seeing, but there are few stinkers and a lot of watchable ones as well." He further added that Super J-Cup was "ultimately a solid, top-to-bottom junior heavyweight wrestling tournament that fans of the 1990s junior style will likely enjoy for both match quality and for a chance to see a motley crew of wrestlers in one place at differing stages of their careers. It is not an all-time great, but rather a fun tournament that shouldn’t be skipped over if you are a fan of the junior heavyweight style."

References

Super J-Cup
2000 in Japan
2000 in professional wrestling
April 2000 events in Japan